Thondangi mandal is one of the 21 mandals in Kakinada district of Andhra Pradesh. As per census 2011, there are 15 villages.

Demographics 
Thondangi mandal has total population of 87,592 as per the Census 2011 out of which 44,412 are males while 43,180 are females and the average sex ratio of the mandal is 972. The total literacy rate of the mandal is 55.67%. The male literacy rate is 53.68% and the female literacy rate is 45.12%.

Towns and villages

Villages 

 A. Kothapalle
 A.V.Nagaram
 Anuru
 Bendapudi
 Gopalapatnam
 Kommanapalle
 Kona Forest
 Krishnapuram
 P. Agraharam
 P.E.Chinnayapalem
 Pydikonda
 Ravikampadu
 Srungavruksham
 Thondangi
 Vemavaram

See also 

 List of mandals in Andhra Pradesh

References 

Mandals in Kakinada district